Slavko is a Slavic masculine given name. Notable holders of the name include:

Arts
 Slavko Avsenik, Slovenian musician
 Slavko Avsenik, Jr., Slovenian musician
 Slavko Brankov, Croatian actor
 Slavko Brill, Croatian Jewish sculptor
 Slavko Kalezić, Montenegran singer
 Slavko Labović, Serbian-Danish actor
 Slavko Osterc, Slovenian composer
 Slavko Pengov, Slovene painter
 Slavko Sobin, Croatian actor
 Slavko Stolnik, Croatian painter
 Slavko Štimac, Serbian actor
 Slavko Vorkapić, Serbian-American film director

Politics and Military
 Slavko Cuvaj, Croatian politician
 Slavko Dokmanović, Croatian Serb politician
 Slavko Kvaternik, Croatian fascist leader
 Slavko Linić, Croatian politician
 Slavko Perović, Montenegrin politician
 Slavko Šlander, Slovenian war hero
 Slavko Štancer, Croatian general
 Slavko Vukšić, Croatian politician

Sports
 Slavko Beda, Croatian football player
 Slavko Cicak, Montenegrin-Swedish chess player
 Slavko Goluža, Croatian handball player
 Slavko Ištvanić, Croatian football player
 Slavko Kodrnja, Croatian football player
 Slavko Lukić, Serbian football player
 Slavko Luštica, Croatian football player
 Slavko Marić, Bosnian Serb football player
 Slavko Matić, Serbian football player
 Slavko Obadov, Serbian judoka
 Slavko Pavletić, Croatian football player
 Slavko Perović (footballer), Serbian football player
 Slavko Petrović, Serbian football player
 Slavko Radovanović, Serbian football player
 Slavko Stefanović, Serbian basketball player
 Slavko Stojanović, Croatian football player
 Slavko Svinjarević, Serbian football player
 Slavko Šajber, Croatian football manager
 Slavko Šurdonja, Croatian football player
 Slavko Vraneš, Montenegrin basketball player
 Slavko Vučković, Serbian football player
 Slavko Zagorac, Bosnian Serb football player

Writers and Journalists
 Slavko Ćuruvija, Serbian journalist
 Slavko Fras, Slovenian journalist
 Slavko Goldstein, Croatian writer
 Slavko Janevski, Macedonian writer
 Slavko Pregl, Slovenian writer

Others
 Slavko Hirsch, Croatian physician
 Slavko Kremenšek, Slovene historian
 Slavko Kulić, Croatian economist
 Slavko Löwy, Croatian architect
 Slavko Milosavlevski, Macedonian sociologist
 Slavko Wolf, Croatian Jewish lawyer
 Slavko Ziherl, Slovenian psychiatrist

See also
Slavkovići
Slavkovica

Slavic masculine given names
Bulgarian masculine given names
Croatian masculine given names
Serbian masculine given names
Slovene masculine given names
Montenegrin masculine given names